In motorsport, the racing line is the optimal path around a race course. In most cases, the line makes use of the entire width of the track to lengthen the radius of a turn: entering at the outside edge, touching the "apex"—a point on the inside edge—then exiting the turn by returning outside.

Description 

Driving the racing line is a primary technique for minimizing the overall course time. As the optimal path around a race course, the racing line can often be glimpsed on the asphalt in the form of tire skid marks. A.J. Baime described its formation in the early laps of a race at Le Mans:

Racing line optimization 
A primary goal of the racing driver is to determine the optimum line around a race track. This optimum line may vary depending on whether a driver wishes to achieve a minimum lap time during a qualifying session, conserve tires and fuel, or fend off a pass from another driver during a race.

Race tracks are often broken down into separate elements such as standard corners, chicanes, double apexes, and straights.  A corner can then be further broken down into the deceleration phase of corner entry, followed by the apex, and finally the acceleration phase during corner exit.

Corner entry 
The corner entry phase often begins with straight-line threshold braking where the goal is to achieve maximum deceleration rate. This is followed by the turn-in where the driver begins to steer the vehicle toward the apex. Traditionally, many drivers were taught to complete all braking before this turn-in portion and take a more circular path with a constant speed to the apex. Later, many racing drivers started to incorporate trail-braking into their corner entry. Trail-braking involves carrying brake pressure past the turn-in point which allows the forces generated by the tires to decelerate the car in a more optimized direction. This more optimized direction of force causes a vehicle to travel on an Euler spiral shaped path of decreasing radius to the apex. If done properly, this results in a higher average speed and lower elapsed time to the apex compared to the traditional circular entry.

Apex 
In basic terms, the apex or clipping point is the point on the inside portion of a corner that a vehicle passes closest to. The apex can also be described as the point of minimum radius and slowest speed achieved in a corner. An apex can be defined as being an earlier apex or later apex. An earlier apex will reach the inside of a corner at a higher speed and with a larger radius than a later apex. A driver will typically choose their apex based on their vehicle's corner exit abilities with higher acceleration optimally requiring a later apex.

Corner exit 

The corner exit phase begins at the apex when the vehicle begins to accelerate. The corner exit phase is often understood to be the most important aspect of a corner for minimizing lap times and so a driver will often focus on optimizing corner exit performance. A driver's goal during corner exit is to maximize the acceleration of the vehicle in the direction of the following straight. Vehicles with lower acceleration potential in a corner will typically achieve this by applying full throttle from the apex and taking a more circular path. Higher acceleration vehicles may be limited by wheelspin and will not achieve full throttle until the corner is nearly complete. This will create a corner exit path of increasing radius that will often mirror the Euler spiral-shaped corner entry path.

References

External links 
 Elements of the racing line, illustrated
 Video: the physics of the racing line
 Tutorial: the physics of the racing line

Driving techniques
Motorcycle dynamics